In mathematics, the Leray–Hirsch theorem is a basic result on the algebraic topology of fiber bundles. It is named after Jean Leray and Guy Hirsch, who independently proved it in the late 1940s. It can be thought of as a mild generalization of the Künneth formula, which computes the cohomology of a product space as a tensor product of the cohomologies of the direct factors. It is a very special case of the Leray spectral sequence.

Statement

Setup
Let 
be a fibre bundle with fibre . Assume that for each degree , the singular cohomology rational vector space

is finite-dimensional, and that the inclusion 

induces a surjection in rational cohomology 
.
Consider a section of this surjection 
, 
by definition, this map satisfies 
.

The Leray–Hirsch isomorphism
The Leray–Hirsch theorem states that the linear map 

is an isomorphism of -modules.

Statement in coordinates
In other words, if for every , there exist classes

that restrict, on each fiber , to a basis of the cohomology in degree , the map given below is then an isomorphism of  modules.

Notes

Fiber bundles
Theorems in algebraic topology